Lundgaard & Tranberg Arkitekter is a Danish architectural firm, based in Copenhagen, Denmark.

History
Lundgaard & Tranberg was founded in 1985 by Boje Lundgaard and Lene Tranberg. In the 1990s, the firm gained a reputation as designers of heat & power plant and other technical facilities, while its breakthrough in the general public came in the mid-2000s with the Charlottehaven residential project from 2004 and particularly the award-winning and highly celebrated designs for the Tietgenkollegiet student residences and a new building for the Royal Danish Theater. In 2004, just when the firm's major success set in, Boje Lundgaard departed, and Lene Tranberg continued the practice with a new partner group.

Selected projects

 Trapholt Museum, Kolding (Phase1: Boje Lundgaard & Bente Aude (1988). Phase 2: Lundgaard & Tranberg Architects (1996))
 Charlottehaven, Copenhagen (2004)
 Tietgenkollegiet, Copenhagen (2006)
 Kilen, Copenhagen Business School, Copenhagen (2007)
 Royal Danish Playhouse, Copenhagen (2008)
 Havneholmen, Copenhagen (2009)
 SEB Bank & Pension, Copenhagen (2010)
 Sorø Art Museum, Sorø (2011)
 Pier47, Copenhagen (2015)
 Kannikegården, Ribe (2016)
 Ofelia Square, Copenhagen (2016)
 Axel Towers, Copenhagen (2017)
 The Museum of Danish Resistance, Copenhagen (2020)

Selected awards 
 2006 RIBA European Award for Kilen
 2007 RIBA European Award for Tietgenkollegiet
 2008 RIBA European Award for Royal Danish Playhouse
 2011 RIBA European Award for Havneholmen Apartments
 2011 RIBA European Award for SEB Bank
 2013 RIBA EU Award for Sorø Art Museum

Gallery

See also
 Architecture of Denmark
 List of Danish architectural firms

References

External links

 Official website
 Student's dormitory in Copenhagen. Architectural review by a+t architecture publishers

Architecture firms of Denmark
Architecture firms based in Copenhagen
Companies based in Copenhagen Municipality
Danish companies established in 1983
Design companies established in 1983